Reptile Youth (formerly Reptile & Retard) is an electronic rock duo from Aarhus in Denmark. Founded in 2009, they have received fame in China after being promoted by the former Oasis booker Michael Ohlsson.

In March 2011, Reptile Youth started recording their first EP with the producer David M. Allen.

Discography
 Reptile Youth (2012)
 Rivers That Run for a Sea That Is Gone (2014)
 Away (2015)

References 

Danish electronic musicians
Musical groups established in 2008